Andrew Hunter (1813–1902) was a noted Methodist preacher, sometimes referred to as "The Grand Old Man of Arkansas", "The Patriarch of Methodism", "The Nestor of Methodism in Arkansas", and "The Foremost Churchman in Arkansas".

Biography

Hunter was born in Ballymoney Antrim, Ireland, the son of John Hunter, a linen textiles manufacturer. His family immigrated to the United States in 1815, when he was 2 years old, settling in Little York, Pennsylvania. While his mother had been a member of the Presbyterian Church while in Ireland, her husband was not affiliated with any sect. His father died when Andrew was 8 years old after a long illness. During this time the family was frequently visited by a Methodist minister, which resulted in the family becoming Members of the Methodist Church.

Hunter attended college in Missouri for a short time before moving in 1835 he moved to Manchester, Missouri, near St. Louis, and began teaching school. While there he saw in a church paper a letter from Peter McGowan, the Superintendent of South Indian Missionary District urgently calling for teachers in Indian Schools. Hunter decided to travel the three hundred miles to the Indian Mission in Fort Gibson. At the time this was over very rough terrain through routes that typically followed streams, often having to sleep out in the open. The school consisted of around 20 students, and was located near where Kansas, Missouri and Texas Railroad crossed the Arkansas River North to Muskogee, in a yard donated by a Mr. Lott. Although Hunter was living in relative poverty, sleeping in a makeshift bed in the school house and eating with whoever would have him, Hunter considered this the happiest time of his life.

In 1836, due to his service in the school, he was give a license to preach and a recommendation from the quarterly conference, which consisted mostly of Indians. The Arkansas Conference had been set up the same year, and Hunter was received "on trial." The conference was divided into four districts, over which the presiding elders traveled quarterly. Hunter was first appointed to a missionary school at Bayou Baynard, and this began his long career as a Methodist minister. He was ordained a deacon in Fayetteville, Arkansas in 1839 he became an elder in Little Rock, Arkansas. In the fall of 1842 he was made presiding elder of the Washington District, which comprised a large portion of Southern Arkansas. He served as pastor of what is now First United Methodist Church in Little Rock twice, first appointed in 1842. He became one of the most popular preachers in Arkansas as well being well respected throughout the country.  In 1866-67 he was elected to represent Dallas and Bradley Counties in the Arkansas State senate and was president of that body. In 1866 Hunter was elected US Senator from Arkansas by the State Legislature along with Elisha Baxter, however he was not allowed to take his seat in Congress due to disenfranchisement of Southern States at the beginning of Reconstruction. Augustus Hill Garland took his place instead.

Dr. Hunter died on June 3, 1902, in his 89th year, after having held almost every office his church offered: teacher, missionary, pastor of both small and great churches, presiding elder for 20 years, delegate to Annual Conferences, a member of 12 General Conferences, and of the 1891 Ecumenical Conference.
 
He was laid to rest in Oakland Cemetery, beside his wife.  The Hunters were married in 1844 and had four children.  Mrs. Hunter was active in establishing the Woman's Missionary Society of the Little Rock Conference in 1878.  Elected president of the organization in 1879, she served in that office for five years.
 
At the time of Hunter's death, Dr. John H. Riggin described him as a pulpiteer, saying: "His mellow, vibrant voice made his speech impressive.  His hearers soon understood that there was nothing rash or inconsiderate in his words, nothing light or trifling, nothing for show or merely to attract attention to the speaker, that the message – not himself – was his concern…"

The Andrew Hunter House, a house he lived in, is near Bryant, Arkansas, built in c.1870 is listed on the U.S. National Register of Historic Places.

Hunter Memorial Methodist Church

A newspaper clipping dated December 3, 1898, reads: "Last Sunday should be a red letter day in its history and one to be remembered by members of Hunter's Memorial Methodist Episcopal Church, South.  On that day was formally opened for public worship one of the prettiest, neatest, most comfortable and, in everything, completest houses dedicated to God that Little Rock has yet had built within her bounds.  Well may the good folks of Hunter Memorial feel proud.  With becoming modesty, they are loath to assume the credit for what has been done, giving praise to God first for enabling them to carry our that work which He has put in the mind of their reverend benefactor, Leon Le Fevre to design and plan for the,."
 
Aside note appeared in the 1947 publication stating that "Leon Le Fevre, member of a French family that had settled at the Little Rock site before the region became American territory, had bequeathed $2,800 in cash and a plantation, for the construction of a Methodist Church ."
 
The Rev. James Major, pastor of Hunter Church from 1945 to 1948, wrote a history of the church for the 50th anniversary celebration which included the following statements: "It was the life of Andrew Hunter that inspired a wealthy man by the name of Leon Le Fevre to leave in his will property valued at $5,000 to be sold and the proceeds used for the building of a Methodist Church east of what is now McArthur Park and south of East 9th Street."
 
The cornerstone for the first church was laid on March 27, 1897, on Barber Avenue, between 11th and 12th streets.  Dr. Hunter dedicated the church on the last Sunday in March 1901, after all the indebtedness was paid.

References

1813 births
1902 deaths
Irish Methodist ministers
Methodists from Arkansas
19th-century American Methodist ministers
Arkansas state senators
Irish emigrants to the United States (before 1923)
People from Antrim, County Antrim
19th-century American politicians